The sharp-tailed grass tyrant (Culicivora caudacuta) is a species of bird in the family Tyrannidae, the only one in the genus Culicivora.

It is found in Argentina, Bolivia, Brazil, Paraguay, and Uruguay.
Its natural habitats are dry savanna and subtropical or tropical seasonally wet or flooded lowland grassland.
It is threatened by habitat loss.

References

External links
BirdLife Species Factsheet.

sharp-tailed grass tyrant
Birds of Bolivia
Birds of Brazil
Birds of Paraguay
sharp-tailed grass tyrant
Taxa named by Louis Jean Pierre Vieillot
Taxonomy articles created by Polbot